Midnight Live is an original unique television program combining interviews with on-scene live report on real-life issues and behavior trends, broadcast weekdays from midnight to 1:30 a.m. on Indonesia's Metro TV. The program explores on a specific topic with first-hand resources interviewed live in the studio while the phenomenon is being carried live by on-the-spot reporter. Midnight Live also has interactive segments where viewers can give live comments through call-ins and text messages. It has been the highest-rated talk program during midnight by a television station in Indonesia.

Indonesian television series